The Blade, also known as Abbey Mill House, is a high-rise and the tallest building in Reading, Berkshire, England. The first tenant to occupy the building was Kaplan Financial, who moved to the building from the original Thames Tower.

Building 
The high rise building was proposed in 2001, and construction lasted from 2007 to 2009. It cost £32 million to build.

The building's façade is a curtain wall system of aluminium and glass, and the building is strengthened with a pile foundation. The spire atop the building is a lattice frame covered with rainscreen panels. The height of the building is 128m above ground level.

The Blade has 110,000 sq ft for office use, 7,200 sq ft of space of which was let to Gateley, a law firm, for £34 per sq ft, one of the highest rents Reading has achieved.

References

External links 

 

Buildings and structures in Reading, Berkshire
Skyscraper office buildings in England